The Piano Sonata in B minor, S.178, is a piano sonata by Franz Liszt. It was completed in 1853 and published in 1854 with a dedication to Robert Schumann.

History 

Liszt noted on the sonata's manuscript that it was completed on 2 February 1853, but he had composed an earlier version by 1849. At this point in his life, Liszt's career as a traveling virtuoso had almost entirely subsided, as he had been influenced towards leading the life of a composer rather than a performer by Carolyne zu Sayn-Wittgenstein almost five years earlier. Liszt's life was established in Weimar and he was living a comfortable lifestyle, composing, and occasionally performing, entirely by choice rather than necessity.

The Sonata was dedicated to Robert Schumann, in return for Schumann's dedication of his Fantasie in C major, Op.17 (published 1839) to Liszt. A copy of the work arrived at Schumann's house in May 1854, after he had entered Endenich sanatorium. Pianist and composer Clara Schumann did not perform the Sonata despite her marriage to Robert Schumann; according to scholar Alan Walker she found it "merely a blind noise".

Reception
The Sonata was published by Breitkopf & Härtel in 1854 and first performed on 27 January 1857 in Berlin by Hans von Bülow. It was attacked by Eduard Hanslick who said "anyone who has heard it and finds it beautiful is beyond help". Johannes Brahms reputedly fell asleep when Liszt performed the work in 1853, and it was also criticized by the pianist and composer Anton Rubinstein. However, the Sonata drew enthusiasm from Richard Wagner following a private performance of the piece by Karl Klindworth on April 5, 1855. Otto Gumprecht of the German newspaper Nationalzeitung referred to it as "an invitation to hissing and stomping". It took a long time for the Sonata to become commonplace in concert repertoire, because of its technical difficulty and negative initial reception due to its status as "new" music. However by the early stages of the twentieth century, the piece had become established as a pinnacle of Liszt's repertoire and has been a popularly performed and extensively analyzed piece ever since.

Music 
No other work of Liszt's has attracted anywhere near the amount of scholarly attention paid to the Sonata in B minor. It has provoked a wide range of divergent theories from those of its admirers who feel compelled to search for hidden meanings. Possibilities include:
 The Sonata is a musical portrait of the Faust legend, with "Faust," "Gretchen," and "Mephistopheles" themes symbolizing the main characters.
 The Sonata is autobiographical; its musical contrasts spring from the conflicts within Liszt's own personality.
 The Sonata is about the divine and the diabolical; it is based on the Bible and on John Milton's Paradise Lost.
 The Sonata is an allegory set in the Garden of Eden; it deals with the Fall of Man and contains "God," "Lucifer," "Serpent," "Adam," and "Eve" themes.
 The Sonata has no programmatic allusions; it is a piece of "expressive form" with no meaning beyond itself.

Walker claims the quiet ending of the Sonata was an afterthought; the original manuscript contains a crossed-out ending section which would have ended the work in a loud flourish instead.

Analysis
The Sonata unfolds in approximately 30 minutes of unbroken music. While its distinct movements are rolled into one, the entire work is encompassed within an overarching sonata form — exposition, development, and recapitulation. Liszt effectively composed a sonata within a sonata, which is part of the work's uniqueness, and he was quite economical with his thematic material. The first page contains three motive ideas that provide the basis for nearly all that follows, with the ideas being transformed throughout.

Some analyses suggest that the Sonata has four movements although there is no gap between them. Superimposed upon the four movements is a large sonata form structure, although the precise beginnings and endings of the traditional development and recapitulation sections have long been a topic of debate. Others claim a three-movement form, a one-movement structure, and a rotational three-movement work with a double exposition and recapitulation.

The first theme is a descending scale marked sotto voce; full of ominous undertow. It reappears at crucial points in the work's structure. This leads immediately to a jagged, forceful motif in octaves. This is quickly followed by a hammering marcato motif in the left hand. A dialogue ensues, with mounting energy, until reaching the noble Grandioso material in D major. Liszt transforms the "marcato" motif into a lyrical melody later. The slow movement, an Andante sostenuto, is the centerpiece of the Sonata. This fully-fledged movement, in compound ternary form, features, in quick succession, a number of themes heard earlier in the Sonata in a tour de force of thematic economy. The final recapitulatory section is launched by a driving fugato of contrapuntal skill which leads to the compressed return of the opening material. Calling upon every intellectual resource and fully exploiting the pianist's technical arsenal, it is at this point where a performer's concentration might wane. Each of the sections are examples of Classical forms, which means that this piece is one of the first instances of Double-function form, a musical piece which has two classical forms happening at the same time; one containing others. Already in 1851 Liszt experimented with a non-programmatic "four-movements-in-one" form in an extended work for piano solo called Grosses Concert-Solo. This piece, which in 1865 was published as a two-piano version under the title Concerto pathétique, shows a thematic relationship to both the Sonata and the later Faust Symphony.

Arrangements 
Camille Saint-Saëns, a close friend of Liszt, made a two-piano arrangement of the Sonata in 1914, but it was never published in his lifetime because of rights issues. It was first published in 2004 by Édition Durand in Paris, edited by Sabrina Teller Ratner. According to a letter from Saint-Saëns to Jacques Durand, dated 23 August 1914, the two-piano arrangement was something that Liszt had announced but never realized.

Leó Weiner made an orchestral arrangement of the Sonata in 1955. The arrangement has not been published and exists only in manuscript form. It was recorded in 2006 by the orchestra of Hochschule für Musik Franz Liszt, Weimar with Nicolás Pasquet conducting, and in 2009 by the North Hungarian Symphony Orchestra under  for the label Hungaroton (HCD 32634).

Heinz Roemheld orchestrated the Sonata which is heard on some 1930s movies, including The Black Cat (1934), starring Boris Karloff and Bela Lugosi, The Raven (1935), as well as the Flash Gordon serials (1936) (Chapters 6–13), Werewolf of London (1936), and Mars Attacks the World (1938).

An orchestrated version of the lyrical parts of the Sonata appears in the 1960 Hollywood film of Liszt's life called Song Without End.

There is an orchestrated excerpt version of the Sonata in the 1952 film Hans Christian Andersen starring Danny Kaye where the ballet scene for "The Little Mermaid" is danced near the end of the film.

Frederick Ashton used the Sonata for his 1963 ballet Marguerite and Armand, created for Margot Fonteyn and Rudolf Nureyev, based on "The Lady of the Camellias" by Alexandre Dumas, fils. The original performances used an orchestral transcription of the Sonata by Humphrey Searle. In 1968 the Royal Ballet commissioned a new arrangement, by Gordon Jacob.

An organ transcription of the Sonata was made in 1984 by Bernhard Haas.

There is also a transcription of the Sonata for solo cello made by cellist Johann Sebastian Paetsch in 2013. This has been published by the Hofmeister Musikverlag in Leipzig.

An arrangement for string quartet was made in 2021 by Louis Sauter. It is available on the page .

References

Sources 
 Longyear, R.M. “Liszt's B minor Sonata: Precedents for a structural analysis.” The Music Review, 34, no. 3–4 (Aug–Nov 1973): 198–209.
 Longyear, R.M. “The Text of Liszt’s B Minor Piano Sonata.” The Musical Quarterly, Vol. 60, No. 3 (Jul., 1974), pp. 435–50.
 Ott, Bertrand. “An interpretation of Liszt's Sonata in B minor.” JALS: The journal of the American Liszt Society, 10 (Dec 1981): 30–38.
 Saffle, Michael. “Liszt's Sonata in B minor: another look at the 'double function' question.” JALS: The journal of the American Liszt Society, 11 (June 1982): 28–39.
 Szasz, Tibor. “Liszt’s Symbols for the Divine and Diabolical: Their Revelation of a Program in the B Minor Sonata.” Journal of the American Liszt Society, 15 (1984): 39–95.
 Arnold, Ben. “Recitative in Liszt's solo piano music.” JALS: The journal of the American Liszt Society, 24 (July–Dec 1988): 3–22.
 Hamilton, Kenneth. "Liszt: Sonata in B minor". Cambridge University Press 1996.
 Whitelaw, Bryan A. "Franz Liszt's Piano Sonata in B Minor: Context, Analysis and Hermeneutics." Belfast: Queen's University Belfast, 2017.
 Whitelaw, Bryan A. "Franz Liszt's Sonata Narratives: Large-Scale Forms at the Weimar Court." Belfast: Queen's University Belfast, 2021.
 Tanner, Mark. “The power of performance as an alternative analytical discourse: The Liszt sonata in B minor.” 19th-century music, 24, no. 2 (fall 2000): 173–192.
 Brown, David. “The B Minor Sonata Revisited: Deciphering Liszt.” The Musical Times, Vol. 144, No. 1882 (Spring, 2003), pp. 6–15.
 Walker, Alan. "Franz Liszt: The Weimar Years, 1848–1861." Ithaca: Cornell University Press, 1989.

External links 
 
 Recording of this Sonata by Alberto Cobo
 Attempts to decipher the symbolic content

Compositions by Franz Liszt
Liszt
1853 compositions
Compositions in B minor
Music with dedications